Google Shell, or goosh, is an open-source browser based Unix-like shell used as a front end for Google Search. Written in AJAX the results are shown directly on the page. Google Shell is open source under the Artistic License/GPL. The code is currently hosted on Google Code.

Commands
Users are able to use most of the features of Google through specific commands and keywords. Functions that are marked with a * are currently experimental, and should be used with caution. While most of the command results are displayed as text, a few will display a portion of a website for you to interact with.

Customization
The default amount of results when searching is only 4, but this, along with other settings, can be changed. When a user is logged into their Google Account, their settings are saved remotely.

References

External links

Google Search
Google Code

Internet search engines
Multilingual websites
Shell